The Taipei Economic and Cultural Center in India is the representative office of Taiwan in India, functioning as a de facto embassy in the absence of diplomatic relations. It was established in 1995.

It is headed by a Representative, currently Baushuan Ger.

The Center is also responsible for relations with Nepal and Bhutan, and has joint responsibility for Bangladesh with the Taipei Economic and Cultural Office in Thailand in Bangkok. Between 2004 and 2009, affairs with Bangladesh were handled by the Taipei Economic and Cultural Office in Bangladesh in Dhaka.

There is also a Taipei Economic and Cultural Center in Chennai. This has responsibility for Sri Lanka and the Maldives, as well as the southern states and territories of India.

Its counterpart body in Taiwan is the India-Taipei Association in Taipei.

Divisions
 Consular Division
 Economic Division
 Education Division
 Science and Technology Division

Representatives
 Tien Chung-kwang (2013–2020)

See also
 India–Taiwan relations
 Foreign relations of Taiwan
 Foreign relations of India
 List of diplomatic missions of Taiwan
 List of diplomatic missions in India
 Taipei Economic and Cultural Center in Chennai

References

Diplomatic missions in India
1995 establishments in Delhi
Diplomatic missions in New Delhi
Organizations established in 1995
India
India–Taiwan relations